JS Sekiryū (SS-508) is the eighth boat of Sōryū-class submarines. She was commissioned on 13 March 2017.

Construction and career
Sekiryū was laid down at Kawasaki Heavy Industries Kobe Shipyard on March 15, 2013, as the 2012 plan 2900-ton submarine No. 8123 based on the medium-term defense capability development plan. At the launching ceremony, it was named Sekiryū and launched on 2 November 2015. She's commissioned on 13 March 2017 and deployed to Kure.

Sekiryū homeport is Kure.

Gallery

Citations

External links

2015 ships
Sōryū-class submarines
Ships built by Kawasaki Heavy Industries